The Central Bolívar Bloc was a Colombian paramilitary organization and a bloc of the United Self-Defense Forces of Colombia (AUC).

Demobilization
The Central Bolívar Bloc demobilized in the early 2000s as a result of the agreement reached between the Colombian government and the AUC at Santa Fe de Ralito. 

Blocs of the United Self-Defense Forces of Colombia